Iryna Mikhailauna Kulesha (born 26 June 1986 in Brest, Belarus or in Oberovshina) is a Belarusian weightlifter.

Career
Kulesha originally won an Olympic bronze medal in the under 75 kg weight category at the 2012 Summer Olympics. She was coached by Viktor Shilay. On 21 November 2016, the IOC disqualified six medal winners in weightlifting for failing doping tests at the 2012 Games, including Kulesha, who was stripped of her medal.

Four days earlier, on 17 November 2016, the IOC had disqualified Kulesha from the 2008 Olympic Games and struck her results from the record for failing a drugs test in a re-analysis of her doping sample from 2008.

References

1986 births
Living people
Belarusian female weightlifters
Olympic weightlifters of Belarus
Weightlifters at the 2008 Summer Olympics
Weightlifters at the 2012 Summer Olympics
Competitors stripped of Summer Olympics medals
Doping cases in weightlifting
Belarusian sportspeople in doping cases
Sportspeople from Brest, Belarus
World Weightlifting Championships medalists
20th-century Belarusian women
21st-century Belarusian women